Puppy love is feelings of love resembling the adoring, worshipful affection that may be felt by a puppy.

Puppy love may also refer to:

Film and TV
 Puppy Love (TV series), a comedy television series on BBC Four
 Puppy Love (1919 film), a lost 1919 silent comedy film directed by Roy William Neill
 Puppy Love (1933 film), an animated short film starring Mickey Mouse
 Puppy Love, a 2012 Hallmark TV film with Candace Cameron Bure and others
 Puppylove (2013 film), a 2013 coming-of-age film directed by Delphine Lehericey
 Puppy Love (2021 film), a 2021 film with Wayne Newton
 "Puppy Love," an episode of the TV show Bubble Guppies
 "Puppy Love," an episode of the TV show Barney & Friends
 "Puppy Love," an episode of the TV show Jim Henson's Pajanimals
 "Puppy Love," an episode of the TV show Back at the Barnyard
 "Puppy Love," an episode of the TV show T.U.F.F. Puppy

Songs
 "Puppy Love" (Paul Anka song), covered in 1972 by Donny Osmond
 "Puppy Love" (Lil' Bow Wow song), 2000
 "Puppy Love", a 1956 single by Jerry Samuels
 "Puppy Love", a 1958 single by Little Jimmy Rivers and the Tops
 "Puppy Love", a 1959 single by Dolly Parton, Bill Owens
 "Puppy Love", a 1962 song by Ike & Tina Turner; the B-side of "Tra La La La La"
 "Puppy Love", a 1964 single by Barbara Lewis